"I Got You (I Feel Good)" is a song by American singer James Brown. First recorded for the album Out of Sight and then released in an alternate take as a single in 1965, it was his highest-charting song and is arguably his best-known recording.

Description
"I Got You (I Feel Good)" is a twelve-bar blues with a brass-heavy instrumental arrangement similar to Brown's previous hit, "Papa's Got a Brand New Bag". It also features the same emphasis "on the one" (i.e. the first beat of the measure) that characterizes Brown's developing funk style. The lyrics have Brown exulting in how good he feels ("nice, like sugar and spice") now that he has the one he loves, his vocals punctuated by screams and shouts. The song includes an alto sax solo by Maceo Parker.

Precursors
"I Got You (I Feel Good)" developed from an earlier Brown-penned song, "I Found You", with a nearly identical melody and lyrics. "I Found You" had been recorded by Brown's back-up singer Yvonne Fair and released as a single (King 5594) in 1962, with little success.

In 1964, Brown recorded an early version of "I Got You (I Feel Good)" with a different arrangement, including a stuttering rhythm and prominent baritone sax line, under the title "I Got You". This version appeared on the Smash Records album Out of Sight and in the 1965 film Ski Party, in which Brown lip synchs his performance on June 30. It was intended for a single release but was withdrawn due to a court order from King Records, with whom Brown was involved in a contract dispute.

Recording
In 1965, after visiting Criteria Studios in Miami and being impressed by the sound of the studio's custom recording console, King Records owner Syd Nathan booked a recording session for Brown, during which he recorded the version of "I Got You (I Feel Good)" released by the label as a single.

Reception
The song entered the Billboard charts on November 13, 1965 following an October release, and reached number three on December 18. Of Brown's 91 hits to reach the Billboard Hot 100, "I Got You (I Feel Good)" is Brown's highest-charting song. The song remained at the top of the Billboard Rhythm and Blues Singles chart for six non-consecutive weeks, after his previous single, "Papa's Got a Brand New Bag", held the number-one spot for eight weeks. Brown's screams at the beginning and end of the song have been sampled a number of times for hip hop and dance songs. The song has also been covered many times by other performers, and is frequently played at sporting events. The song is played at the Zentralstadion whenever RB Leipzig scores a goal.

Cash Box described it as a "rhythmic, funky ode about a real lucky guy who wants nothing more than to be near his gal."

In 2000, "I Got You (I Feel Good)" reached No. 21 on VH1's 100 Greatest Songs in Rock and Roll and No. 75 on VH1's 100 Greatest Dance Songs, one of only seven songs to make both lists. In 2004, "I Got You (I Feel Good)" was ranked No. 78 on Rolling Stone magazine's list of the 500 Greatest Songs of All Time.

Appearances in film and television
In 1965, James Brown, and his vocal group, the Famous Flames (Bobby Byrd, Bobby Bennett and Lloyd Stallworth) performed the song in a cameo in the American International Pictures comedy film Ski Party. Since then, the song has appeared in numerous film soundtracks.

Personnel
 James Brown — vocals

with the James Brown Orchestra:
 Ron Tooley — trumpet
 Joe Dupars — trumpet
 Levi Rasbury — trombone
 Mike Ridley — trumpet
 Nat Jones — alto saxophone, Hammond organ
 St. Clair Pinckney — tenor saxophone
 Eldee Williams – tenor saxophone
 Al "Brisco" Clark – tenor saxophone
 Maceo Parker — alto saxophone
 Jimmy Nolen — electric guitar
 David "Hooks" Williams – bass guitar
 Melvin Parker — drums

Chart positions

Other versions

Live recordings
Brown performs the song on the live albums Live at the Garden (1967), Live at the Apollo, Volume II (1968), Soul Session Live (1989), and Live at the Apollo 1995 (1995).

1975 remake
Brown re-recorded the song for his 1975 album Sex Machine Today.  This version was featured in the film White Men Can't Jump, the video game Rock Band 3, and Don King Presents: Prizefighter.

Paul Dakeyne remix
In 1992, producer and remixer Paul Dakeyne released a 12" remix of "I Got You (I Feel Good)" on FBI Records under the title "James Brown v. Dakeyne – I Got You (I Feel Good) (The Remixes)". It reached No. 72 on the UK Singles Chart.

References

1964 songs
1965 singles
James Brown songs
Songs written by James Brown
King Records (United States) singles
Quotations from music